CD49d is an integrin alpha subunit. It makes up half of the α4β1 lymphocyte homing receptor.

Function 

The product of this gene belongs to the integrin alpha chain family of proteins. Integrins are heterodimeric integral membrane proteins composed of an alpha chain and a beta chain. This gene encodes an alpha 4 chain. Unlike other integrin alpha chains, alpha 4 neither contains an I-domain, nor undergoes disulfide-linked cleavage. Alpha 4 chain associates with either beta 1 chain or beta 7 chain.

Interactions 
CD49d has been shown to interact with LGALS8 and Paxillin.

See also 
 Carotegrast methyl, an integrin alpha 4 antagonist used for the treatment of ulcerative colitis

References

Further reading

External links 
 
ITGA4 Info with links in the Cell Migration Gateway 
 
 

Integrins
Clusters of differentiation